A Balrog is a demon from J.R.R. Tolkien's Middle-earth legendarium.

Balrog may also refer to:

 Balrog (Street Fighter), a character in the Street Fighter video game series
  Vega (Street Fighter), the Street Fighter character named Balrog in the Japanese versions
 Balrog, a recurring boss in the video game Cave Story
 Balrog Award, awarded to science fiction works
 Balrog Botkyrka/Södertälje IK, a Swedish Floorball team outside Stockholm
 Balrog (Pluto), the second-largest dark region on Pluto

See also 
 Anthracosuchus balrogus, an extinct reptile named after Tolkien's Balrog

de:Figuren in Tolkiens Welt#Balrogs